A disintegrin and metalloproteinase with thrombospondin motifs 8 is an enzyme that in humans is encoded by the ADAMTS8 gene.

Function 

This gene encodes a member of the ADAMTS (a disintegrin and metalloproteinase with thrombospondin motifs) protein family. Members of the family share several distinct protein modules, including a propeptide region, a metalloproteinase domain, a disintegrin-like domain, and a thrombospondin type 1 (TS) motif. Individual members of this family differ in the number of C-terminal TS motifs, and some have unique C-terminal domains. The enzyme encoded by this gene contains two C-terminal TS motifs, and disrupts angiogenesis in vivo.

Clinical significance 

A number of disorders have been mapped in the vicinity of this gene, most notably lung neoplasms.

References

Further reading

External links
 The MEROPS online database for peptidases and their inhibitors: M12.226
 

ADAMTS